Long Close School is a coeducational Independent school located in Upton, Slough in Berkshire, England. The school is owned and operated by the Cognita Group, and is the largest independent school in Slough. The school was founded in 1940. It offers a co-educational Nursery, Preparatory, and Senior day school for children two and over. In 2004 the school was bought by Cognita, the largest independent schools business in the UK.

References

External links
 School Website
 Profile on the ISC website

Private schools in Slough
Educational institutions established in 1940
Cognita
1940 establishments in England